Aphanize is a Basque place name. It is found in:

the Aphanize Pass, a mountain pass between the valleys of the Bidouze and the Laurhibar in Lower Navarre
 l'Aphanize, a right tributary of the Saison upstream from Tardets
 l'Aphanixe, a right tributary of the Saison from Haux, Pyrénées-Atlantiques